Betrayed by a Handprint is a 1908 American silent short crime film directed by D. W. Griffith. A print of the film exists.

Cast
 Florence Lawrence as Myrtle Vane
 Harry Solter as Mr. Wharton
 Linda Arvidson as The Maid / Party Guest
 Kate Bruce as Mrs. Wharton (unconfirmed)
 Gene Gauntier as Party Guest
 George Gebhardt as The Palmister
 Mack Sennett as The Butler

References

External links
 
Betrayed By A Handprint available for free download at Internet Archive

1908 films
1900s crime films
American crime films
American silent short films
American black-and-white films
Films directed by D. W. Griffith
Articles containing video clips
1900s American films